The 2020–21 season was FC Kolos Kovalivka's 9th season in existence and the club's second consecutive season in the top flight of Ukrainian football. In addition to the domestic league, Kolos Kovalivka participated in this season's editions of the Ukrainian Cup and the UEFA Europa League. The season covers the period from August 2020 to 30 June 2021. After finishing the seaston on the 4th place in Premier League Kolos qualified to play in European competitions in season 2021–22.

Players

Squad information

Transfers

In

Out

Pre-season and friendlies

Competitions

Overview

Ukrainian Premier League

League table

Results summary

Results by round

Matches

Ukrainian Cup

UEFA Europa League

Statistics

Appearances and goals

|-
! colspan=16 style=background:#dcdcdc; text-align:center| Goalkeepers

|-
! colspan=16 style=background:#dcdcdc; text-align:center| Defenders

|-
! colspan=16 style=background:#dcdcdc; text-align:center| Midfielders 

|-
! colspan=16 style=background:#dcdcdc; text-align:center| Forwards

|-
! colspan=16 style=background:#dcdcdc; text-align:center| Players transferred out during the season

 
Last updated: 9 May 2021

Goalscorers

Last updated: 9 May 2021

Clean sheets

Last updated: 9 May 2021

Disciplinary record

Last updated: 9 May 2021

Attendances

Last updated: 9 May 2021

References

External links

FC Kolos Kovalivka
Kolos Kovalivka
Kolos Kovalivka